Magnitogorsk Iron and Steel Works, abbreviated as MMK, is an iron and steel company located in the city of Magnitogorsk, Russia. As of 2017, it was the 30th largest steel company in the world.

History of Magnitogorsk mining

Historically, the centre of Russian iron production had been focused in the Tula region. However, in the early part of the 18th century, a shift towards developing the industrial capabilities of the Urals took place which more than doubled Russia's iron production. In 1828, a series of geological surveys began as part of an effort to determine the mineral make up of the Megnitnaya Mountain and create estimates of the possible amount of iron contained under it. By the latter part of the 19th century, a small town had grown up which reported more than 10,000 residents. During this time, between 30,000 and 50,000 tons of raw iron were extracted in the area annually.

Establishment of MMK
In the 1870s, the vast majority of the iron ore, steel, and pig iron were being produced in Ukraine. Comparatively, Ukraine with its large deposits and developed industry was responsible for 75% of the iron ore in 1913 to the Ural's 21%. Ukraine remained the focal point of metal production while the competing regions found themselves relegated to significantly reduced importance. It was only following the October Revolution in 1917 that the drive to push for an expanded iron and steel industry began to come to the forefront.

 
As a part of Soviet leader Joseph Stalin's first Five Year Plan to implement a rapid development of the nation's industry, it was decided that the government would sponsor a project with the goal of establishing the world's largest steel production complex. Initially the plan for the project was designed by the Soviets, then they also collaborated with the American-based Arthur McKee & Company, to oversee the construction and planning. The plan to turn Magnitogorsk into the complex that would become MMK came in conjunction with the build-up in the new city of Stalinsk that held large resources of coal.

While there were disagreements regarding the timetable and massive shortages of supplies, the project to build the complex broke ground in 1929 with the influx of thousands of idealistic Soviet workers. The American contractors were critical of the handling of the project and were frustrated by mismanagement and so the majority of the design ended up falling to the Soviets. Much of the failure to properly organize the construction efforts was due in part to the Soviet government's desired speed, which they deemed essential in order to meet their Five Year Plan. Additionally, there were changes in personnel who had faced removal over political concerns that emerged over loyalty to the Communist Party.

In opposition to claims by the advisors from Arthur McKee & Company that the facilities were not yet ready for use, the furnaces at MMK were put into action in 1932 with the first flow of molten pig iron being produced. While this move to initiate activities at the complex was applauded by the Soviet leadership, the plant was forced to halt their production only a few days later due to the need for serious repairs in the furnaces. By 1933, the plant was producing steel.

World War II
MMK played an important role in the Soviet victory over Nazi Germany, being the largest steel company in the Soviet Union, and located far away from combat on the Eastern Front. The strategic concept of developing various huge modern iron and steel works deep inside the country relied on the idea that future defence of the socialist homeland was going to require huge amounts of steel, as well as places to produce iron and steel that were as safe as possible from foreign invasion and aerial bombing raids.

The notion of protecting the USSR's industrial base from invasion and bombing by locating it deep in the interior was not pursued as completely during the 1930s as it might have been; what parts of it were not overrun and confiscated by the Germans were hastily moved eastward in 1941 and 1942. In 1942, the West knew that "at least one armament factory previously situated near Leningrad has arrived in Magnitogorsk lock, stock, and barrel, complete with personnel, and is already going into production using Magnitogorsk steel." The extent of Western knowledge of the huge eastward shift was summed up as follows: "...Even before the outbreak of war, large electrical equipment plants were removed from White Belorussia on the German frontier and also from the Leningrad district to the Urals and Western Siberia. One such plant is reported to have been removed to Sverdlovsk during 1940 and to have been producing normally in March, 1941. Any plant except the largest smelting, steelmaking, and chemical works can be moved by railroad fairly quickly and with little damage." [...] "Thus, while no figures will be available for some time, it is my opinion that large portions  of the industrial machinery formerly located in areas
now occupied by the Germans, instead of being captured by them, are already in operation a thousand or more miles east of the present front, in Stalin's Ural Stronghold."

After the attack on the USSR, on June 22, 1941, MMK obtained its first order for production of metal armor. Instructions were given to proceed to the production of blanks for live shells, and to explore the possibilities of creating specialist products for armored tanks, which required a rebuild of the production facility. The government provided a number of specialists for the development of armored steel. The factory created an Armor Bureau, which was responsible for the development of technology for the production of armored steel products.  By July 23, 1941, the third hearth furnace of MMK produced its first steel output for the military.

Armor sheet production at MMK in the end of 1941 exceeded its pre-war production. Simultaneously, specialized areas and workshops for the production of ammunition was improved. Hand grenades, components for missiles, and other defense products were manufactured. Magnitogorsk was converted into the major military arsenal of the country. The construction and commissioning of new production units continued. Attention was concentrated on blast furnaces No. 5 and No. 6, and this blast furnace steel became the biggest in the USSR.

A number of novel techniques that enriched the theory and practice of construction were developed at the site. Owing to the completion of such a large plant and its capability to fully cycle ore to final product, the nation survived the loss of huge tracts of territory to the Germans.

In 1941, though the factory was not yet completely built, child labour was already being employed at what was called the CL (Central Laboratory).<ref>Facts, Тыл фронту(Rear Edge) p. 22. Сборник воспоминаний, очерков, документов, писем. 1990 г. L.M Evteeva.</ref>

During the first years of the war, about 200,000 teenagers arrived to work at the factory. They worked for 10–11 hours a day, and sometimes in extreme situations as they stayed for 10 days at a time in the factory. It is due to these children that Magnitogorsk was able to build the first tanks and aircraft, as they collected 57 million rubles to help the war front.

By February 1, 1941, about 428,000 people were sent to the Chelyabinsk region to help and work at the factory and its surroundings, in order to raise necessary funds for the war effort. There was a huge housing shortage, so on August 25 the factory leadership decided to initiate a project which included the development of barracks and huts. Educational institutions and health centers with hospitals were also planned as the factory grew.

Before the first hostilities in 1940, MMK was producing tanks but production was sluggish. It was thus decided to stop production of tractors and other machine products and to concentrate on the development and manufacturing of tanks. According to the direction of the State Defense Committee, it was decided to organize mass production of the T-34 medium tank. The fate of the front and the country largely depended on how soon the factory could begin to produce tanks.

MMK in the post-Soviet era

As with the majority of the state-run industries, MMK underwent a series of shifts towards privatization after the fall of the Soviet Union. In 1992, MMK transitioned to become a joint stock company. Due in part to Russia's economic downturn at the time, MMK suffered a significant drop in its levels of productivity. In 1996, production fell to 5.8 million tons per year.

However, in recent years, MMK has rebounded with significantly increased levels of productivity by entering new sectors of the metal works industry. In 2007 the company became a publicly traded company on the London Stock Exchange, and in 2008, crude steel production at the plant was reported to have reached some 12 million tons. There has also been a move to enter into new international markets. Production has increasingly shifted towards the export market with some years reporting the share of exports comprising 70% of total production.

MMK produces 400 different types of steel, and one of its workshops is a mile long.

Joint venture investment in Turkey
On May 23, 2007, the MMK signed a joint venture agreement with the Turkish steel company Atakaş to construct and run a steel plant in the Hatay Province of southern Turkey. On March 15, 2008, the plant's foundation was laid in Dörtyol, Hatay. As of the beginning of 2009, the plant's service center consisted of a hot shear line, as well as a combined cold shear and slitting line.

The plant, which has a capacity of 2.5 million tons of steel products a year, was officially opened by Turkish Prime Minister Recep Tayyip Erdoğan on March 9, 2011. It is one of the biggest of its art in Turkey. On March 10, 2011, it was reported that the MMK applied to the Turkish competition board to buy its Turkish partner's stake.

 Social responsibility 
MMK's facilities employ 38% of the city's working-age population. The company accounted for 57% of the city's budget in 2016, an increase of about 7% from 2015.

The local hockey team, Metallurg, is also owned by MMK.

 Metallurg Charity Foundation 
One of the channels of MMK's social investments is the Metallurg Charity Fund, founded in 1993. In 2016, the financial resources of the fund were EUR 8.7 million.

Carbon footprint
Magnitogorsk Iron & Steel Works reported total CO2e emissions (Direct + Indirect) of 26,798 Kt. for a twelve-month period, ending on 31 December 2020.

See also

 Time, Forward!'', a 1965 Soviet film about one day of construction of "Magnitka"

References

External links
 Magnitogorsk Iron and Steel Works
 Magnitogorsk Iron and Steel
 History of MMK.

Steel companies of Russia
Steel companies of the Russian Soviet Federative Socialist Republic
Companies listed on the Moscow Exchange
Companies based in Chelyabinsk Oblast
Russian brands
Magnitogorsk